Kujang Ch'ŏngnyŏn station is a railway station in Kujang-ŭp, Kujang county, North P'yŏngan province, North Korea. Located on the Manp'o Line of the Korean State Railway, it is an important junction point, being a terminus of the Ch'ŏngnyŏn P'arwŏn Line, the P'yŏngdŏk Line, and the Ryong'am Line.

History

The station, originally called Kujang station, was opened on 15 October 1933 by the Chosen Government Railway, along with the rest of the third section of the Manp'o Line from Kaech'ŏn to Kujang. It received its current name after the establishment of the DPRK.

Culture
The Kujang Area has big coal complexes. This rail station connects the big coal mines with the transport facilities.

References

Railway stations in North Korea